I'm Not Afraid is the fourth full-length album released by John Mark Nelson on 11 September 2015.

Track listing

References 

2015 albums
John Mark Nelson albums